Hibat Tzion (lit. Fondness for Zion) is a moshav in central Israel. Located in the coastal plain near Hadera and covering 4,500 dunams, it falls under the jurisdiction of Hefer Valley Regional Council.

History
The moshav was founded in 1933 by the "Agricultural Estate of the Russian Zionist Centre" organization. It was named after the Hovevei Zion organization (also known as Hibbat Zion in Hebrew). The founders were later joined by immigrants from Central Europe.

It had the first organic Annona grove in Israel, and it remains the country's largest. It also had the country's first crematorium, which was operated by Alei Shalekhet. It was burned down by protesters in August 2007.

References

Moshavim
Hitahdut HaIkarim
Populated places established in 1933
Populated places in Central District (Israel)
1933 establishments in Mandatory Palestine
Russian-Jewish culture in Israel